Dark Matters: Twisted But True is a television series featured on the Science Channel. Hosted by actor John Noble of Fringe and Lord of the Rings, the show takes the viewer inside the laboratory to profile strange science and expose some of history's most bizarre experiments. This show uses narration and reenactments to portray the stories in this show. A new season of episodes, under the title Dark Matters: Extra Twisted, premiered on January 23, 2013. The episodes revisit previous stories with "deeper insight and new information."

Episodes

Season 1

Season 2

References

External links
Science Channel Home Page

CTV Sci-Fi Channel original programming
2010s American science fiction television series
Paranormal television
2010s American documentary television series
2010s American drama television series
2010s American horror television series
2011 American television series debuts
2012 American television series endings
Cultural depictions of Albert Einstein
Cultural depictions of Louis Pasteur
Television series about urban legends
Science Channel original programming